Lloyd Werft Wismar (former VEB Mathias-Thesen-Werft Wismar, Aker MTW Werft, Wadan Yards MTW, Nordic Yards Wismar) is a German shipbuilding company, headquartered in Wismar. Since June 1, 1990 it has been part of the Deutschen Maschinen- und Schiffbau AG (DMS AG), 2009–2016 was part of the Nordic Yards Holding GmbH, and since 2016 is part of the Lloyd Werft Group.

History
The ship repair yard was founded by Red Army on April 27, 1946. The Ivan Susanin was the first ship repaired at this yard. The shipyard developed quickly, from Soviet ship repair yard to VVB Schiffsreparaturwerft Wismar, in 1948, renamed to Hochseeschiffbau Mathias-Thesen-Werft Wismar VEB, in 1951. The first new ship V. Chkalov was built for the Soviet Union as war reparations after World War II on March 30, 1954.

In 2016, Genting Hong Kong purchased Nordic Yards Wismar and combined it with the Nordic Yards Warnemunde and Stralsund shipyards and the German Lloyd Werft shipyard to form the Lloyd Werft Group, subsequently reorganized as MV Werften.

Ships built by Nordic Yards Wismar 2009-2016

Container ships

  2010 - being converted (2015-2018) as Auxiliary replenishment vessel for Royal Canadian Navy

Ships built by VEB Mathias-Thesen-Werft Wismar 1951-1990 (selection)

Folding kayaks
 Typ Kolibri

Cargo ships
 Typ Afrika
 Typ MBC
 Typ OBC

River cruise ships
 V. Chkalov (1954) - Rodina-class motorship for Yenisei Shipping Company
 Korolenko (1954)
 Kavkaz (1958)

Ocean liners/Cruise ships
  (1958) - scrapped in India 1994
 Feliks Dzerzhinskiy (1958) - sank off Canton, China 1993
  (1959) - scrapped in India 1992
 Bashkiriya (1964) - sank 2006 in Chao Praya River (Bangkok, Thailand) as MS Siritara Ocean Queen
 Aleksandr Pushkin (1965) - renamed as MS Marco Polo in 1991 and scrapped in India 2021
MS Mikhail Lermontov (1972) -  sank 1986 near Marlborough Sounds in New Zealand

See also
Elbewerft Boizenburg
Wadan Yards

References

External links

 Nordic Yards Home Page

Shipbuilding companies of Germany
Manufacturing companies established in 1946
Companies based in Mecklenburg-Western Pomerania
1946 establishments in Germany
Companies of East Germany